"Little red dot" (or "The Red Dot", or "Little Red Dot") is a nickname often used in the media, and in casual conversation, as a reference to Singapore. It refers to how the nation is depicted on many maps of the world and of Asia as a red dot. The sovereign country and city-state comprising the main island and all its islets – a total land area of approximately  – is much smaller than its Southeast Asian neighbours.

Initially used as a pejorative by other countries to refer to Singapore, the term was quickly adopted and reappropriated by both Singaporean politicians and citizens alike with pride and a sense of the nation's prosperity and success despite its physical limitations. In 2015, Singapore celebrated its Golden Jubilee, the 50th anniversary of its independence, with the term "SG50" depicted inside a red dot.

Origin and subsequent developments
The term "little red dot" gained currency after the third Indonesian President B. J. Habibie was regarded as having criticized Singapore in an article published in the Asian Wall Street Journal of 4 August 1998. It was reported that Habibie had remarked that he did not have the feeling that Singapore was a friend, and had pointed to a map, saying: "It's O.K. with me, but there are 211 million people [in Indonesia]. All the green [area] is Indonesia. And that red dot is Singapore." The remark was seen as a dismissal of Singapore, having referred to the country in a disparaging manner.

Former Prime Minister of Singapore, Goh Chok Tong, responded in his National Day Rally Speech on 23 August 1998. Goh called the effect of the Asian financial crisis in 1997 on Indonesia a "major tragedy", noting that the rupiah was worth only a fifth of what it was against the US dollar in June 1997; the banking system had almost collapsed; the economy was expected to contract by 15% in 1998; and that riots had taken place in the country in May 1998, mostly targeting Chinese Indonesians. He then said, "Singapore will help Indonesia within the limits of our ability. We are a small economy. ... After all we are only three million people. Just a little red dot on the map. Where is the capacity to help 211 million people?"

Reflecting on Habibie's remarks at a conference on 3 May 2003, Singapore's former Deputy Prime Minister (and present Prime Minister), Lee Hsien Loong, said: "This [Habibie's remark] was a vivid and valuable reminder that we are indeed very small and very vulnerable. The little red dot has entered the psyche of every Singaporean, and become a permanent part of our vocabulary, for which we are grateful."

On 19 September 2006, Habibie explained to reporters that far from dismissing Singapore in 1998, he had meant to highlight Singapore's achievements despite its small size. He said that he had made the remark while speaking off-the-cuff with members of an Indonesian youth group and trying to "give them spirit". He said that he had told them: "If you look at the map of Southeast Asia, you [Indonesia] are so big, and Singapore is just a dot. But if you come to Singapore, you see people with vision." He also claimed that "I have corrected [myself] many times, but they have never put it . And I could not prove it in writing because I was talking freely."

Popular usage

The term "little red dot" has come to be used by both Singaporean politicians and ordinary citizens with pride and with a sense of the nation's success despite its physical limitations. With reference to Singapore, the term has also been used in the following contexts:

Little Red Dot, a magazine aimed at primary school students published by The Straits Times that was launched in 2005.
The Little Red Dot, the title of a 2005 book edited by Tommy Koh and Chang Li Lin about the rise of Singapore through the eyes of 50 of its diplomats.
The Little Red Dot series of storybooks for Primary 1 and 2 students developed by Nexus (the Central National Education Office of the Government of Singapore). Four books have been published: Little Red Dot, Little Red Dot Bounces Back, Little Red Dot Fights Back and Little Red Dot Comes Home. The stories have themes such as resilience, a sense of rootedness, teamwork, unity and vigilance.
Little Red Dot Academy, an aviation training and consultancy company headquartered in Singapore which was founded in 2004.
Little Red Dots, a design collective based in Singapore that was conceived in 2004.
Treasures of the Little Red Dot, a project initiated by Creativeans to develop and showcase designs inspired by Singapore culture and its immediate reality.
On the Red Dot, a Channel NewsAsia current affairs programme which first aired in 2012.

Notes

Further reading
.
.
.
.
.
.

External links
"Little red dot" at the Double-Tongued Dictionary
"Little red dot" at the Dictionary of Singlish and Singapore English

Names of places in Asia
Nicknames
Singaporean culture